The Seventh Date of Blashyrkh is black metal band Immortal's first live DVD.  All content is from the Wacken Open Air set they performed in 2007, as part of their comeback tour, The Seventh Date of Blashyrkh.

Track listing
"The Sun No Longer Rises"
"Withstand the Fall of Time"
"Sons of Northern Darkness"
"Tyrants"
"One by One"
"Wrath from Above"
"Unholy Forces of Evil"
"Unsilent Storms in the North Abyss"
"At the Heart of Winter"
"Battles in the North"
"Blashyrkh (Mighty Ravendark)"

Personnel

 Abbath Doom Occulta – vocals, guitar
 Horgh – drums
 Apollyon – bass

Charts

References

Immortal (band) albums
2010 video albums
Live black metal albums
Black metal video albums